Curtis "Curt" Fish is an American curler and 1989 national champion from Seattle, Washington.

Curling career
In 1989 Fish played third on Jim Vukich's team, winning the US Men's Championship and placing tenth at World's.

Teams

References

External links 

American male curlers
American curling champions
Sportspeople from Seattle
Year of birth missing (living people)
Place of birth missing (living people)